Ernesto Pastor Lavergne (April 4, 1892 - June 11, 1921) was the first of only two Puerto Rican-born bullfighters (toreros) to gain international fame, the other being Juan Ramón Fernandez.

Early life and career
Some date Pastor's birth year as 1900, but it is generally accepted that he was born in 1892. He was born in San Juan, Puerto Rico to a Mexican father and French mother.

Pastor was considered by his contemporary colleagues to be talented both with the sword and the cape. On January 15, 1911, he made his public debut, at a plaza in Guadalajara, Mexico. There, he would be revered as one of the best of his era.

Pastor relocated to Spain in 1916, fighting for the first time there on May 16, 1916 in Barcelona. In Spain, he was mentored by José Gómez Ortega. In 1918, Pastor engaged in 38 bullfighting spectacles, and in 1919, he debuted in Madrid.

Death
It was in Madrid on June 11, 1921 that Pastor met with death. On June 11, 1921, during a bullfighting event, his leg was gored by a bull. Bleeding profusely, he managed to ask who turned off the lights? before passing away. The hemorrhage in his leg had caused him to go blind before dying.

See also

Juan Ramón Fernandez
Toreadora Conchita Cintron 
List of Puerto Ricans
List of Mexicans

References

External links

19th-century births
1921 deaths
People from San Juan, Puerto Rico
Puerto Rican bullfighters
Sport deaths in Spain
Puerto Rican emigrants to Spain